Jakob Hoff Oftebro (born 12 January 1986) is a Norwegian actor. He has appeared in more than twenty films since 2004 including Hamilton and Kon-Tiki, which was nominated for the Academy Award for Best Foreign Language Film at the 85th Academy Awards.

In 2014, he was cast as a lead in the Danish television production of 1864, a war epic. The series made headlines in Scandinavia due to its massive budget, one of the largest in Danish television history.

Jakob's half-brother is actor Jonas Hoff Oftebro (born 7 May 1996, Oslo), the son of Nils Ole Oftebro and Anette Hoff.

Selected filmography

Film

Television

References

External links

 

1986 births
Living people
Male actors from Oslo
Norwegian male film actors
Norwegian male television actors
21st-century Norwegian male actors